Eduard Fouché (born ) is a South African rugby union player for the  in Super Rugby, the  in the Currie Cup and the  in the Rugby Challenge. His regular position is fly-half or centre.

References

South African rugby union players
Living people
1997 births
People from Witbank
Rugby union fly-halves
Rugby union centres
Golden Lions players
Pumas (Currie Cup) players
Lions (United Rugby Championship) players
Rugby union players from Mpumalanga
Griquas (rugby union) players